The displacement–length ratio (DLR or D/L ratio) is a calculation used to express how heavy a boat is relative to its waterline length.

DLR was first published in 

It is calculated by dividing a boat's displacement in long tons (2,240 pounds) by the cube of one one-hundredth of the waterline length (in feet):

DLR can be used to compare the relative mass of various boats no matter what their length. A DLR less than 200 is indicative of a racing boat, while a DLR greater than 300 or so is indicative of a heavy cruising boat.

As shown in the 2 graphs in the kindle-sample of the 6th edition ( but not anywhere in the full-book of the 7th ) of Adlard Coles' "Heavy Weather Sailing", whether a given DLR is considered "heavy" or "light" *is entirely dependent on how big the boat is*.

Those numbers in the table, above, match a boat of exactly 30.5' LWL.  A boat of any other size will be "light" or "heavy" at a different DLR:

a 10' LWL boat that is Ultralight is under DLR 412; Light is between 412 & 823; Moderate is between 823 & 1235; Heavy is between 1235 & 1647, & Ultraheavy is above that.

A 40' LWL boat that is Ultralight is under DLR 70; Light is between 70 & 140 ; Moderate is between 140 & 209; Heavy is between 209 & 279; & Ultraheavy is above that.

The different scaling-factors for different aspects of a boat ( length, beam, displacement, sail-area carrying capability, etc ) are not identical multipliers, as explained in "Principles of Yacht Design" 3rd edition, which is why DLR is only meaningful when one knows the DLR, and the LWL and the intended kind of boat.

See also 
 Sail Area-Displacement ratio

References

Ship measurements
Nautical terminology
Engineering ratios
Naval architecture